The Naiset Formation is a stratigraphic unit of Middle Cambrian age. It is present on the western edge of the Western Canada Sedimentary Basin in the southern Rocky Mountains of British Columbia. It consists primarily of siliciclastic rocks, and was named for Naiset Point near Mount Assiniboine by C.E. Deiss in 1940.

Thickness and lithology
The Naiset Formation ranges in thickness from about 100 to 212 m (328 to 695 ft), and was deposited in a deep-water marine environment. It consists primarily of thin-bedded shale and siltstone. There are minor beds of sandstone, conglomerate, and calcareous mudstone at the base, and minor beds of oolitic and oncolitic limestone near the top.

Distribution and relationship to other units
The Naiset Formation is present in Rocky Mountains of southeastern British Columbia. It unconformably overlies the Gog Group. It is overlain by the Cathedral Formation, and the contact is gradational. Equivalent strata to the east of the Kicking Horse area are assigned to the Mount Whyte Formation.

References

Western Canadian Sedimentary Basin
Cambrian System of North America
Cambrian British Columbia
Stratigraphy of British Columbia
Geologic formations of Canada